is a 1992 single recorded by Japanese singer-songwriter Matsuko Mawatari. This is her second single from her second album Nice Unbalance. It reached the 45 position on the Japanese charts in 1992 and again in 2005, reaching number 187 for one week. "Hohoemi no Bakudan" in 2004 was, however, charted together with the song  by Hiro Takahashi. B-side of the single features a song from her first album , ".

This song also became the opening theme of the anime series YuYu Hakusho and is included on its compilation album Sai-Kyou Best Selection Album.

Cover versions
Shoko Nakagawa, 2010 album Shoko-tan Cover 3: Anison wa Jinrui o Tsunagu.
Megumi Ogata, album YuYu Hakusho (collective rare trax).
Mariya Ise
Atsuko Enomoto
Atsushi Abe
Hisayoshi Suganuma
Marina Inoue
Sara White

Track listing

1992 release

2005 release

Chart positions

Charts

References

1992 singles
2005 singles
YuYu Hakusho
Anime songs
1992 songs
Pop ballads
1990s ballads